Espace may refer to:
ESPACE, a complexity class in computational complexity theory
Espace musique, a Canadian radio service
Espace 2, a Swiss radio station
Radio Espace, a French radio station
Espace Group, a French media company
Group Espace, a concrete art group
Renault Espace, a multi-purpose-vehicle
eSpace, an Egyptian software company